R365 road may refer to:
 R365 road (Ireland)
 R365 road (South Africa)